These are the squads for the countries that played in the 1979 Copa América. The first round was played in three groups of three teams with Peru, receiving a bye to the semi finals.

Group A

Chile 

Coach: Luis Santibáñez

Colombia 

Head Coach:  Blagoje Vidinić

Venezuela 
Head Coach:  Walter Roque

Group B

Argentina 
Head Coach:  César Luis Menotti

Bolivia 

Coach: Ramiro Blacut

Brazil 
Head Coach: Cláudio Coutinho

Group C

Ecuador 

Head Coach:

Paraguay 
Head Coach:

Uruguay 
Head Coach: Roque Máspoli

Semi-final

Peru 
Coach:

References

Squads
1979 in sports
Copa América squads